Miles Rutherford Browning (April 10, 1897 – September 29, 1954) was an officer in the United States Navy in the Atlantic during World War I and in the Pacific during World War II. A pioneer in the development of aircraft carrier combat operations concepts, he is noted for his aggressive aerial warfare tactics as a captain on the  during World War II. His citation for the Distinguished Service Medal states: "His judicious planning and brilliant execution was largely responsible for the rout of the enemy Japanese fleet in the Battle of Midway." Craig Symonds disagreed, writing that “the citation claim[ing] that Browning was ‘largely responsible’ for the American victory at Midway, an assertion that some historians have taken seriously . . . is manifestly untrue.”

Early life
Miles Browning was born in Perth Amboy, New Jersey, the son of Sarah Louise (née Smith) and New York City stockbroker Oren Fogle Browning, Jr. He attended public schools before his appointment to the U.S. Naval Academy, Annapolis, in 1914. He graduated early, commissioned Ensign with the Class of 1918 on June 29, 1917.

Career
From February, 1918 he then had duty in connection with fitting out the battleship . In June 1918, he joined the French cruiser Lutetia, and was an observer aboard while she operated with Cruiser Force, Atlantic Fleet, through the end of the war.

Lieutenant Browning joined the destroyer  in 1920, serving as executive officer until transferred a year later to similar duty as XO of the destroyer .

In January 1924, Browning reported to Naval Air Station Pensacola for flight training. He showed exceptional skill in the cockpit, but also exhibited a "wild streak" which struck his squadron mates as "potentially dangerous." From January 1925 until May 1927, Browning was assigned to Observation Squadron 2, attached first to the minelayer , later to the battleship . Advanced to Operations Officer, he served for two years at Naval Station Norfolk, Virginia. Promoted to Naval Flight Officer, he was assigned his first command in July 1929: Scouting Squadron 5S, the aviation unit of the light cruiser . During that time he performed additional duty on the staff of the commander of Light Cruiser Division Two of the Scouting Fleet (USS Trenton, flagship).

As an early combat aviator, Browning helped develop and implement fighter aircraft tactics and strategy; he also helped shape how naval warplanes were designed and built. In July 1931, he reported to the Bureau of Aeronautics to serve in the Material Division (Design), and spent the next three years helping to design and test combat aircraft. As a test pilot, he crashed a plane in 1932 and was laid up in a San Diego naval hospital. The monoplane fighters which Browning and others piloted went through numerous upgrades in both structure and function, every design change hotly debated by men whose very lives were at stake. Browning was part of the group of "progressives" that pushed for development of a high-performance fighter, with maneuverability secondary to speed. These men felt that a true fighter had to be fast enough to quickly overtake and shoot down enemy planes. Unfortunately for Browning and the other progressive thinkers, the Bureau of Aeronautics continued to emphasize maneuverability, climb, and flight ceiling at the expense of speed and other characteristics that the progressives argued were more important. If the bureau had been more receptive to the emphasis on speed, the United States might have entered World War II with a more advanced high-performance fighter.

He served in that capacity until June 1936, when he reported to the Naval War College in Newport, Rhode Island, for postgraduate studies with additional duty at the Naval Torpedo Station there. Upon completion of his junior year, he became one of the first naval instructors at the Air Corps Tactical School at Maxwell Field in 1937, training a new generation of fighter pilots while continuing his advanced studies in combat theory, national security policy, airborne command and control and joint military operations.

Browning laid out his tactical logic in a 13-page, single-spaced, typewritten memorandum on carrier warfare prepared at the Naval War College in 1936, the year that Nazi Germany allied with Fascist Italy and Imperial Japan. Browning's essay briefly noted the vulnerability of carriers during the aircraft re-arming process, which he later successfully exploited during the Battle of Midway. After completing his academic work, Browning was appointed to Admiral William F. Halsey's staff in the new billet of Air Tactical Officer. In June 1938, he joined the United States' second new aircraft carrier, to serve as commander of Yorktowns carrier air wing. Browning personally developed and organized the Fleet Aircraft Tactical Unit based on Yorktown, and commanded it for two additional years. When Halsey became the commander of Air Battle Forces two years later, Browning remained on his staff as Operations and War Plans Officer and became Halsey's Chief of staff in June 1941. From the onset of U.S. involvement in World War II, Browning provided tactical counsel to Halsey from the bridge of the carrier .

As war loomed on the horizon, Halsey had Browning prepare the crew of Enterprise and her aircraft squadrons. They were en route to Hawaii after delivering a doomed Marine Corps fighter squadron to Wake Island when the Japanese attacked Pearl Harbor. USS Enterprise scout bombers arrived over Pearl during the attack, and immediately went into action in defense of the naval base. Six of them were shot down. The carrier reached the devastated harbor just after the attack, and put to sea again early the next morning to patrol against any additional threats to the Hawaiian Islands. (Enterprise planes sank a Japanese submarine on December 10, 1941, three days into the war.)

With the United States Pacific Fleet nearly destroyed, USS Enterprise and her battle group took up forward defensive positions west of Hawaii. Eight of the fleet's nine battleships had been trapped in the harbor, four of them sunk and four heavily damaged, along with three of the fleet's eight cruisers present during the dawn attack.

Designated flagship of the Pacific Fleet, Enterprise sailed in January 1942 to protect American convoys reinforcing Samoa. Soon, though, under the aggressive leadership of Halsey and Browning, Enterprise took up the offensive. In February and March 1942, Browning directed numerous daring air raids on Japanese bases at Kwajalein, Wotje, and Maloelap in the Marshall Islands, and blasted enemy installations in the Gilbert Islands, Marcus Island, and Wake Island. Halsey gave credit for much of his own remarkable military success to his chief of staff, and recommended Commander Browning for a spot promotion to the rank of captain. So dramatic were Browning's air raids on Japanese island bases that Life magazine dubbed him "America's mastermind in aerial warfare."

Browning's promotion was approved by CINCPAC that April following the "Doolittle Raid", in which Browning himself played a role in both planning and executing. Dubbed "Jimmy Doolittle's Raid" by the American press, the daring scheme launched 16 Army Air Forces long-range bombers, led by Lt. Col. James H. Doolittle, from the deck of the carrier , with Enterprise providing combat air support. The squadron dropped bombs on Tokyo and other Japanese cities on April 18, 1942, completely surprising the Japanese and giving the beleaguered American troops and public a much-needed boost in morale.

Midway

Halsey suffered a severe attack of dermatitis on the Enterprise on the way back from the successful Doolittle bombing. Rear Admiral Raymond A. Spruance, Halsey's hand-picked successor, inherited Browning and his staff just prior to the Battle of Midway. Spruance, who had commanded only a cruiser division since the beginning of the war, was concerned about leading a carrier group because he had no prior aviation or carrier experience. Halsey reassured him, telling Spruance to rely on his battle-hardened staff, especially Browning.

Unfortunately, Browning had an abrasive personality and Spruance found it difficult to get along with his chief of staff during and after Midway. Military historian Samuel Eliot Morison referred to Browning as "one of the most irascible officers ever to earn a fourth stripe, but he was a man with a slide-rule brain." Others said he had a "calculator brain" and "a superintellect that evoked praise – often begrudging – from his superiors." Browning is commonly described as "crusty and brawling," clever, daring, exceptionally aggressive and uncontrollable. He was by no means a deft social mixer. He was willful, arrogant, a hard drinker, and violently tempered. Despite his unpopularity, he was respected as a brilliant tactical officer.

Midway would be a critical battle for the United States and its allies, one that all parties knew might very well determine the outcome of the war in the Pacific. After the devastation of its battleships at Pearl Harbor six months earlier, the U.S. Navy was forced to place all its hopes on a small aircraft carrier force that was dwarfed by the strength of Japan's Combined Fleet. As chief of staff for Task Force 16, Browning was charged with supporting Rear Admiral Spruance during the impending battle as the Imperial Japanese Navy, undefeated for over 350 years, bore down on Midway Island.

American intelligence had decoded Japanese messages and knew roughly where the Combined Fleet would be headed. Although unaware of that breach in its radio security, the Japanese Navy changed its codes out of protocol while under sail for the strategically crucial U.S. airbase at Midway. The Imperial Fleet, under Admiral Isoroku Yamamoto, knew that it would meet resistance. The intention was to draw whatever was left of the American fleet into a battle wherein any remaining U.S. naval warships could be destroyed. Yamamoto's second-in-command, Vice Admiral Chuichi Nagumo, the hero of Pearl Harbor, was so confident in the plan that he failed to anticipate carrier-based aerial attacks from any of America's remaining carriers, and presumed that the heavily damaged Yorktown had been sunk during the Battle of the Coral Sea.

Some accounts credit Browning's tactical genius and carrier operations experience with winning the battle of Midway. According to these, Spruance wanted to wait to launch fighter aircraft until the Japanese ships were within . Spruance's biographer Thomas Buell disagreed, saying that Spruance had always planned to launch as early as possbible, and according to Naval historian John Lindstrom "Morison misunderstood the time expressed in the TF 16 war diary and “created the fiction of Spruance’s supposed desire to delay the launch. It did not arise from Browning’s wartime reputation or from any recollections by participants.”  Browning caught the Japanese ships without adequate protection and was able to sink all four of Japan's big carriers, as he had predicted in his 1936 tactical thesis.

Guadalcanal

Browning, unfortunately, was a man of tremendous contradictions. At his moment of triumph, in the summer of 1942, he had an affair with the wife of a fellow officer, Commander Francis Massie Hughes. That breach of the Navy's sacred code for an officer, combined with his drinking and unstable temperament, would eventually derail his career and lead later chroniclers to virtually write him out of military history. Despite this damaging personal incident, Browning resumed combat duties in October 1942, when Halsey was given command of the South Pacific theater, where Allied fortunes had turned for the worse. Browning's sage tactical advice helped Halsey to execute the command miracle in the Solomon Islands that reversed the declining situation in that war-swept region.

Like Midway, the Guadalcanal Campaign was another critical "turning point" in the Pacific war. The first major offensive by combined Allied forces against Japanese-held territory, it was a desperate ongoing sea, air, and ground campaign requiring continual, almost daily, aircraft actions orchestrated by Browning. Repeated Japanese counterstrikes were repelled while the entire South Pacific Force – including U.S and Allied army, navy and marine forces – was run by Halsey, Browning, a handful of staff officers and some fifty bluejackets. Their tactics, and the sacrifices of thousands of soldiers, sailors and marines under their command, resulted in the historic naval victory at Guadalcanal in early November 1942.

Again, Halsey gave Browning credit for his success. In a New Year's Day 1943 letter to Admiral Nimitz (CINCPAC) concerning Browning's precarious career situation, Halsey wrote, "Miles has an uncanny knack of sizing up a situation and coming out with an answer." Admitting that his chief of staff was "decidedly temperamental", Halsey begged Nimitz not to break up "this partnership" between himself and Browning, writing, "I am almost superstitious about it." Several days later, however, Browning antagonized visiting Secretary of the Navy Frank Knox, earning himself another powerful enemy who then replaced Browning over Halsey's objections. Admiral Ernest King, Chief of Naval Operations and Commander-in-Chief, United States Fleet, and another old enemy, concurred. Halsey instead pushed for a promotion to Commodore for Browning. In March 1943, Browning married Jane Matthews, the woman with whom he had the 1942 affair; she was his fourth and last wife. During his tenure of command,  took part in massive aerial raids against Japanese bases in the Pacific, including Palau, Truk, and Ponape, and provided carrier-launched air support during the Allied invasion of New Guinea and the Jayapura operation.

Banishment
In the spring of 1944, during a nighttime showing of a film on Hornet's hangar deck, someone discharged a CO2 canister and triggered a stampede. In the chaos, two sailors fell overboard; one of them drowned. By this time, Browning had alienated several of his superiors, including Admirals Joseph J. Clark and Marc Mitscher, who were waiting for Browning to make a misstep after numerous mistakes in ship-handling and general insubordination. He was also generally hated by his subordinates, in particular, the pilots, who held him responsible for numerous crashes as he enforced an unrealistically short take-off distance for the Curtiss SB2C Helldiver based on the theoretical claims of the manufacturer, instead of the practical experience of the pilots. When Browning refused to have a boat lowered to rescue the drowning sailors, despite Admiral Clark's recommendation that he do so, a board of investigation was ordered, which criticized Browning's command. The ensuing ruin of his career, "one of the great wastes to the American prosecution of the war, resulted from nothing to do with combat. Browning was removed from command of Hornet in May 1944 and reassigned to the Command and General Staff College at Fort Leavenworth, Kansas, where he taught carrier battle tactics during the final months of the war. Halsey was given command of the carrier-oriented Third Fleet during 1944–1945, but with his old chief of staff tossed onto the beach, he made grave mistakes that Browning might well have been able to help prevent.

Browning toured Japan in 1949, and stated that radiation damage from the atomic bombs was a "myth". He pointed to gardens and a number of tall chimneys left standing in Hiroshima and Nagasaki as proof that there were no long-term effects of the blasts.

Browning retired from active duty on January 1, 1947, and was retroactively promoted to rear admiral (upper half). He was appointed New Hampshire's Civil Defense Director in 1950, where he devised a plan wherein 500,000 displaced residents of Boston could be housed in New Hampshire private homes in the event of disaster. Browning resigned from this post in 1952.

On September 29, 1954, Browning died of systemic lupus erythematosus at Chelsea Naval Hospital in Boston. He was buried on October 6, 1954, at Arlington National Cemetery.

Fictional portrayals
In the 1976 film Midway, Browning was portrayed by actor Biff McGuire.
In the 1988 TV-mini series War and Remembrance, Episode 3, Browning was portrayed by actor Michael McGuire. In the 2019 film Dauntless: The Battle of Midway, Browning was portrayed by actor C. Thomas Howell.

Awards and decorations
  Navy Distinguished Service Medal
  Silver Star
  World War I Victory Medal with Atlantic Fleet Clasp 
  American Defense Service Medal with Fleet Clasp
  American Campaign Medal
  Asiatic-Pacific Campaign Medal with Silver and Bronze Engagement Stars
  World War II Victory Medal
Presidential Unit Citation, USS Enterprise
Presidential Unit Citation, USS Hornet
Naval Aviator Badge
Naval Flight Officer Badge

Personal life
Browning was married three times.

On May 20, 1922, Browning married San Francisco socialite Cathalene Isabella Parker (1906-1987), stepdaughter of Vice Admiral Clark H. Woodward. From 1922 to January 1924, Browning served as Senior Patrol Officer on the cruiser USS Charleston and the destroyer , operating out of Naval Station San Diego. During that time, his only daughter, Cathalene Parker Browning, was born in San Diego (her son is the American comedian Chevy Chase).

After his divorce from Parker, Browning married Marie Héloïse Barbin (1907-2005) in June 1931.

In 1943, he married Katherine Jane Eynon (1909-1982).  They were married for the rest of his life.  Jane Browning in 1970 testified to Congress about the small widow's pension she received and her penury.

See also

History of United States Naval Operations in World War II
Mariana and Palau Islands campaign
Midway order of battle
Pacific War
Pacific Theater of Operations
The Two-Ocean War

References

External links
Naval Historical Center - Battle of Midway 
Naval Historical Center - Naval Aviation in the Pacific  (PDF file)
Naval Historical Center - USS Hornet (CV-12) 

1897 births
1954 deaths
People from Perth Amboy, New Jersey
United States Naval Academy alumni
Naval War College alumni
United States Naval Aviators
United States Navy rear admirals (upper half)
United States Navy personnel of World War I
United States Navy World War II admirals
Battle of Midway
Burials at Arlington National Cemetery
Recipients of the Navy Distinguished Service Medal
Recipients of the Silver Star
Deaths from lupus
United States Army Command and General Staff College faculty
Military personnel from New Jersey